Krivandino may refer to:
Krivandino, Novosokolnichesky District, Pskov Oblast, a village in Novosokolnichesky District of Pskov Oblast, Russia
Krivandino, Velikoluksky District, Pskov Oblast, a village in Velikoluksky District of Pskov Oblast, Russia
Krivandino, name of several other rural localities in Russia